Festuca magellanica is a species of grass in the family Poaceae. It is native to south Chile to west Argentina. It is perennial and mainly grows in temperate biomes. Festuca magellanica was first published in 1788 by Herman Johannes Lam.

References

magellanica
Angiosperms of Argentina
Angiosperms of Chile
Flora of the Falkland Islands
Plants described in 1788
Taxa named by Herman Johannes Lam